Manitoba Provincial Road 217 (PR 217) is a short provincial road in Manitoba, Canada.  It begins at PR 246 (St. Mary's Road) near St. Jean Baptiste and runs east to PR 219 near Carlowrie, passing through the community of Arnaud.  It is mostly a gravel road.

References

External links
Official Manitoba Highway Map

217